opal® is the brand name for apple cultivar 'UEB 32642'. The variety originates from a natural crossing of 'Golden Delicious' with 'Topaz'. 

Developed by the Institute of Experimental Botany in Prague, it is grown by FirstFruits Farms LLC in Washington and marketed by FirstFruits Marketing. 

It is also cultivated in Austria, Italy, Spain, Germany, Slovenja, France and the United Kingdom. 'UEB 32642' is a variety registered at the Community Plant Variety Office of the European Union under EU N°: 16749.

This variety of apple is naturally low in polyphenol oxidase and is often sold pre-sliced.

References

External links
 Opal Brand Page
 Opal Information Page
 Institute of Experimental Botany Academy of Sciences, Czech Republic

Czech apples
Apple cultivars